This is a list in alphabetical order of Papua New Guinean cricketers who have played first-class cricket. Papua New Guinea first played first-class in the 2015–2017 ICC Intercontinental Cup against the Netherlands. The team played seven first-class matches in the tournament, at the conclusion of which the Intercontinental Cup was discontinued. Only one Papua New Guinean-born cricketer has played first-class cricket for a team besides Papua New Guinea, Geraint Jones, who played county cricket in England, in addition to appearing in Test cricket for England.

The details are the player's usual name followed by the years in which he was active as a first-class player and then his name is given as it would appear on modern match scorecards. Players are shown to the end of the 2017–18 season.

A
 Charles Amini (2015–2015–16) : C. J. A. Amini

B
 Dogodo Bau (2016–17) : D. Bau
 Sese Bau (2015/16–2017–18) : S. Bau

D
 Mahuru Dai (2015–2017–18) : M. D. Dai
 Kiplin Doriga (2017–18) : K. Doriga

G
 Willie Gavera (2015–2016–17) : W. T. Gavera

J
 Geraint Jones (2001–2015): G. O. Jones

M
 Vani Morea (2015–2017–18) : V. V. Morea

N
 Loa Nou (2015–2015–16) : L. Nou

P
 Nosaina Pokana (2016/17–2017–18) : N. Pokana

R
 Damien Ravu (2017–18) : D. A. Ravu
 John Reva (2015–2017–18) : J. B. Reva

S
 Lega Siaka (2015–2017–18) : L. Siaka
 Chad Soper (2015/16–2017–18) : C. A. Soper

U
 Tony Ura (2015–2017–18) : T. P. Ura

V
 Assad Vala (2015–2017–18) : A. Vala
 Norman Vanua (2015–2017–18) : N. Vanua
 Jack Vare (2015–2017–18) : J. N. T. Vare

References

Cricket in Papua New Guinea
P